Reuben Slonim (1914-January 20, 2000) was a Canadian rabbi and journalist.

Early life
Slonim was born in Winnipeg, Manitoba. After his immigrant father suffered a stroke, Slonim's mother was left to tend to her husband and three children. She and her children boarded at Jewish Orphanage and Children's Aid of Western Canada, where she was the cook. In his memoir Grand to Be an Orphan, Slonim recalled that while the Orphanage offered educational opportunities, some of the staff also dished out beatings.

Education
With Orphanage support, Slonim studied at a yeshivah in Chicago and attended the Illinois Institute of Technology, where he received his B.S.A.S. in 1933. He then attended the Jewish Theological Seminary, where he was ordained and earned an M.H.L. in 1937. He also attended the Albany Law School, New York, between 1935 and 1937.

Community activism
Slonim held a variety of community positions, including president of the Toronto Zionist Council (1947–52) and chair of the Synagogue Council State of Israel Bonds (1955–60). Slonim grew angry, however, over the policies of the State of Israel and what he perceived as the uncritical support of Israel within the Jewish community.

Journalism
In 1955 The Toronto Telegram hired Slonim as associate editor on the Middle East. Until the newspaper's demise in 1971 and later in the Jewish Standard, Slonim often attacked Orthodox influence on Israeli politics and Israel's treatment of Palestinians. He also championed Israeli withdrawal from occupied territories and strongly opposed the 1982 Lebanon war.

Rabbi
In 1937 he became rabbi at Toronto's McCaul Street Synagogue, one of the first Canadian-born rabbis to serve a Conservative congregation, and he remained there for three years. For the next seven years he occupied pulpits in Cleveland and Troy (n.y.) before returning to Toronto in 1947 to serve the McCaul Street Synagogue until its 1955 merger with the University Avenue Synagogue. He was not named to the senior position in the newly established Beth Tzedec Congregation.In 1960, Slonim was hired by a small and unaffiliated liberal Toronto congregation, Congregation Habonim Toronto, established in the spirit of German Liberal Judaism, by central European Holocaust survivors. Slonim attracted younger, Canadian-born congregants but, to the consternation of some, he also used his pulpit to condemn Israeli policy. After the war in Lebanon, he was dismissed. He described his time as a pulpit rabbi in To Kill a Rabbi (1987). Slonim never at any time expressed anger at the Jewish community where his views were unpopular. He subsequently co-founded the Association for the Living Jewish Spirit, which until 1999 met on High Holidays.

Later life
Towards the end of his life, Slonim received belated recognition from the Jewish community. Rabbi Gunther Plaut, who had often been at loggerheads with Slonim, later admitted that Slonim was unjustly ostracized by the Jewish community and regretted his own part in the process. In 1998, the Jewish Theological Seminary honored Slonim for his years of service. Slonim died January 20, 2000, at his home, a victim of a stroke and Alzheimer’s disease. He was 85. He had been in ill health for the past year, according to his daughter, Rena Tsur. His wife, Reta, predeceased him by six years.

Other writing
In addition to his two memoirs, Slonim published In the Steps of Pope Paul (1965), an account of Pope Paul's visit to the Middle East; Both Sides Now (1972) summarizing his career at the Toronto Telegram, and Family Quarrel: The United Church and the Jews (1977) chronicling disputes over Israel between the Jewish community and the United Church.

References

2000 deaths
Illinois Institute of Technology alumni
Albany Law School alumni
Canadian Conservative rabbis
1914 births